Grant Forsberg (born July 22, 1959) was an American actor, born in Holden, Massachusetts.

He was an actor, best known for Planes, Trains & Automobiles (1987), Old Friends  (1984) and Bloodhounds of Broadway (1989).

Away from the film industry, Forsberg was a co-founder of Soolip Inc., with his wife, Wanda Wen. The business is based in North Hollywood, California, and is a manufacturer and retailer of handmade custom invitations, paper and lifestyle accessories.  He was also producer and co-authored of the book Lost Boys Never Say Die (1991).

References

External links 
 

1959 births
2007 deaths
American male film actors
People from Holden, Massachusetts
Male actors from Massachusetts
20th-century American male actors